Värdegrund (Swedish: "foundation of values") is a Swedish concept first defined in the late 1990s to describe a common ethical foundation for collectives. Examples of collectives are nations, institutions, organizations, and social movements. In Sweden, all schools have to comply with a common ethical foundation. It includes the following ideas: sanctity of human life, individual freedom and inviolability, egalitarianism, equality of the sexes, and solidarity between people.

References

Collectives
Consensus
Ethical codes
Society of Sweden
Swedish words and phrases
1990s neologisms